ChicKing is an Indian-Arabian fast food restaurant chain headquartered in Kochi, Kerala, India that specializes in fried chicken. It was founded by A. K. Mansoor in 2000 in Dubai, United Arab Emirates.

Partnerships 
ChicKing was the food partner of Kerala Blasters in the 2019–20 season of the Indian Super League.

References

External links 
 

Food portal
Restaurants established in 2000
Emirati companies established in 2000
Indian companies established in 2000